The Frank Ewing House is a historic house in Yuma, Arizona. It was built in 1920 for Frank L. Ewing, a businessman.

The house was designed in the Spanish Colonial Revival architectural style. It has been listed on the National Register of Historic Places since December 7, 1982.

References

Houses on the National Register of Historic Places in Arizona
National Register of Historic Places in Yuma County, Arizona
Mission Revival architecture in Arizona
Houses completed in 1920